Lee is an upcoming biographical film directed by Ellen Kuras and written by Lem Dobbs, Marion Hume, John Collee and Liz Hannah, based on The Lives of Lee Miller by Antony Penrose. It stars Kate Winslet as war journalist Lee Miller.

Premise
Lee Miller goes from a career as a glamour model to enlisting as a photographer to chronicle the events of World War II.

Cast
 Kate Winslet as Lee Miller
 Andy Samberg as David Scherman
 Marion Cotillard as Solange D'Ayen
 Alexander Skarsgård as Roland Penrose
 Andrea Riseborough as Audrey Withers
 Josh O'Connor as Antony Penrose
 Noémie Merlant as Nusch Éluard
 Arinzé Kene as Major Jonesy
 Vincent Colombe as Paul Éluard
 Patrick Mille as Jean D'Ayen
 Samuel Barnett as Cecil Beaton
 Zita Hanrot as Ady Fidelin
 James Murray as Colonel Spencer

Production
The project first began development in October 2015, with Kate Winslet attached to star as Miller. In June 2020, cinematographer Ellen Kuras was set to direct the film, with Liz Hannah writing the screenplay.

The biggest development on the film came in October 2021, when Marion Cotillard, Jude Law, Andrea Riseborough and Josh O'Connor joined the cast, with a crew including Alexandre Desplat as composer, Michael O'Connor as costume designer, cinematographer Paweł Edelman and Ivana Primorac as head makeup and hair artist. In February 2022, Andy Samberg was announced as being part of the cast. He would be confirmed in October alongside additional castings including Alexander Skarsgård, who replaced Law in his role.

Filming began in late September 2022 in Croatia. Production paused for a small period of time that month when Winslet slipped during filming. It also shot in Hungary, and filming was wrapped in early December.

References

External links
Lee at the Internet Movie Database

Upcoming films
American biographical drama films
Films shot in Croatia
Films shot in Hungary
Upcoming directorial debut films